Women's rights have been a cornerstone of the political reforms initiated by King Hamad, with women gaining the right to vote and stand as candidates in national elections for the first time after the constitution was amended in 2002. The extension of equal political rights has been accompanied by a conscious drive to promote women to positions of authority within government.

Political participation 
The move to give women the vote in 2002 was part of several wide-ranging political reforms that have seen the establishment of a democratically elected parliament and the release of political prisoners. Before 2002, women had no political rights and could neither vote in elections nor stand as candidates.

There was, however, some ambivalence towards the extension of political rights from sections of Bahraini society, not least from women themselves, with 60% of Bahraini women in 2001 opposing extending the vote to women.

Although many women stood as candidates in both municipal and parliamentary elections in 2002, none were elected to office. There were no women candidates in the lists of Islamist parties such as Al Wefaq, Al-Menbar Islamic Society and Asalah.

Following the poor performance of women candidates in the parliamentary elections, six women, including one Christian, were appointed to the upper chamber of parliament, the Shura Council. In 2004, Bahrain appointed its first female minister, Dr Nada Haffadh to the position of Health Minister, and in 2005, Dr Fatima Albalooshi, the second woman minister was appointed to the cabinet. In 2005, Houda Ezra Nonoo, a Jewish activist, who since 2004 also headed the Bahrain Human Rights Watch Society which has campaigned against the reintroduction of the death penalty in Bahrain, was also appointed to the Shura Council. In April 2005, Shura member Alees Samaan became the first woman to chair a parliamentary session in the Arab world when she chaired the Shura Council. The head of the main women's organisation, the Supreme Council for Women, Ms Lulwa Al Awadhi, has been given the title of 'honorary cabinet minister'.

In June 2006, Bahrain was elected head of the United Nations General Assembly, and appointed Haya Rashid Al Khalifa as the Assembly's President, making her the first Middle Eastern woman and the third woman in history to take over the post. Sheikha Haya is a leading Bahraini lawyer and women's rights advocate who will take over the post at a time of change for the world body. UN Secretary General Kofi Annan said of her, "I met her yesterday and I found her quite impressive. All the member states are determined to work with her and to support her, and I think she's going to bring a new dimension to the work here."

Several women's rights activists have become political personalities in Bahrain in their own right, or even gained international recognition, such as Ghada Jamsheer, who was named by  Forbes magazine as one of the " ten most powerful and effective women in the Arab world" in May 2006.

Ghada Jamsheer, the most prominent women's rights activist in Bahrain has called the government's reforms "artificial and marginal". In a statement in December 2006 she said:

Bahrain's move was widely considered to have encouraged women's rights activists in the rest of the Persian Gulf to step up demands for equality. In 2005, it was announced that  Kuwaiti women would be granted equal political rights to men.

2006 Election

Eighteen female candidates stood at the 2006 Bahraini general election. Most of the female candidates ran for Leftist parties or as independents, with no Islamist party being represented by a woman, although salafist party Asalah was the only group to publicly oppose female candidature in parliamentary elections. Only one candidate, Lateefa Al Gaood, won; in her case by default before polling after her two opponents in her constituency dropped out of the race.

Personal status law
There is no unified personal status law in Bahrain that covers matters such as divorce and child custody, so that Sharia judges have discretion in such matters. In November 2005, the Supreme Council for Women in an alliance with other women's rights activists, began a campaign for change - organising demonstrations, putting up posters across the island and carrying out a series of media interviews.

However, changing the law has been resisted by the leading Shia Islamist party, Al Wefaq, resulting in a major political showdown with women's rights activists. Al Wefaq argued that neither Chamber of Deputies elected MPs nor the government have the authority to change the law because these institutions could 'misinterpret the word of God'. Instead, the right to change the law is the sole responsibility of religious leaders.

On 9 November 2005, supporters of Al Wefaq claimed to have organised Bahrain's largest ever demonstration with 120,000 protesting against the introduction of the Personal Status Law, and for the maintenance of each religious group having their own divorce and inheritance laws. On the same day, an alliance of women's rights organisations held a smaller rally calling for the unified law, which attracted 500 supporters.

The issue of the introduction of a unified personal status law has divided civil society into two camps, with women's rights and human rights groups wanting its introduction, opposed by Shia Islamist groups in alliance with the wahabbi Asalah:

For:
 Supreme Council for Women
 Bahrain Human Rights Society
 Bahrain Human Rights Watch Society
 Bahrain Women's Union
 Women's Petition
 Bahrain Young Ladies Association
 National Democratic Action
 Al Sharaka (Bahrain branch of Amnesty International)
 Bahrain Centre for Human Rights

Against:
 Al Wefaq
 Asalah
 Islamic Action Party
 Islamic Awareness Society
 Capital Transparency Society

See also
Be-Free
Women in Bahrain
Munira Fakhro
Sawsan Taqawi

General:
Human rights in Bahrain
Women in Arab societies
Women in Islam

References

External links

A guide to Bahrain, Your complete guide to Bahrain, April 2006
New Dawn for Bahraini Women, Amnesty International, March 2002
Lifting the veil for women in politics, Gulf Daily News, 6 August 2005
In the Gulf, women are not women's best friends, Daily Star, 20 June 2005
Personal law plan rapped, Gulf Daily News, 3 November 2005
Demonstration against family law reform, AKI, 5 November 2005
Law rivals in show of strength, Gulf Daily News, 10 November 2005
  Bahraini woman chairs parliament BBC, 19 April 2005
 Women warned of 'dirty' poll fight, Gulf Daily News, 13 October 2005
 'Clerics biggest obstacle to women's rights in Bahrain' Kuwait Times, 1 April 2006  
  Bahrain's first woman diplomat to lead UN assembly Stuff (New Zealand) 6 June 2006
  Societies slammed for not backing women Gulf News 15 June 2006
 'Achieving prominent positions is a familiar occurrence' Gulf News 27 June 2006
 First female judge   
 'Ghada Jamsheer to UN: are royal reforms for women just token gestures?'   
 'Give women a chance to prove mettle' by Sara Horton.

 
Politics of Bahrain
Human rights in Bahrain
Liberalism in Bahrain